Theodoros Kolokotronis (3 April 1770 – 4 February 1843) was a Greek general and the pre-eminent leader of the Greek War of Independence (1821–1829) against the Ottoman Empire. Kolokotronis's greatest success was the defeat of the Ottoman army under Mahmud Dramali Pasha at the Battle of Dervenakia in 1822. In 1825, he was appointed commander-in-chief of the Greek forces in Peloponnese. Today, Kolokotronis ranks among the most prominent figures in Greece's War of Independence.

Early life
Theodoros Kolokotronis was born at Ramavouni, a mountain in Messenia, and was baptised in the village of Piana. He descended from a family of klefts, and grew up in the village of Libovitsi, Arcadia, in the central Peloponnese. The Kolokotroneoi were a powerful and respected clan in the surrounding areas in the 18th century. Their legendary pride and insubordination is commemorated in a well-known folk song of that time:

"On a horse they go to church,
On a horse they kiss the icons,
On a horse they receive communion
From the priest's hand."

His father, Konstantinos Kolokotronis, took part in an armed rebellion, the Orlov Revolt, instigated by the administration of Catherine the Great of Russia. He was killed in 1780 in an engagement with Ottoman troops, along with two of his brothers, George and Apostolis.

Prior to the Greek Revolution, Theodoros Kolokotronis operated as a kleft (a warrior-bandit), an armatolos (a Christian irregular of the Ottoman military), and as a kápos (a militiaman employed by Greek notables of the Peloponnese). As a kapos, Kolokotronis worked for the Deligiannis family. He acquired wealth by stealing sheep and marrying the daughter of a wealthy Peloponnesian notable.

In 1805 he joined the Russian Navy during the Russo-Turkish War (1806–1812). In 1806 Ottoman attacks against the klefts forced Kolokotronis to flee to the island of Zakynthos (or Zante). When Zakynthos was occupied by the British, he obtained useful military experience while serving under the command of Richard Church, a philhellene, in the 1st Regiment Greek Light Infantry; in 1810, Kolokotronis was promoted to the rank of major. From his service in the British Army, he adopted his characteristic red helmet. While in the Heptanese (a French protectorate from 1807 to 1814), he came in contact with the revolutionary ideas of the era and was influenced by them:

Greek War of Independence

Outbreak

Kolokotronis returned to the mainland just prior to the outbreak of the war (officially, 25 March 1821) and formed a confederation of irregular Moreot klepht bands. These he tried to train and organize into something resembling a modern army. In May, he was named archistrategos or commander-in-chief. He was already 50 years old by this time, a fact which contributed to his sobriquet O Geros tou Morea or "The Elder of Morea," whereby Morea was another name describing the Peloponnese. Kolokotronis's first action was the defense of Valtetsi, the village near Tripoli where his army was mustering. Later, he was also the Commander of the Greek forces during the Siege of Tripolitsa. After the capture of Tripolitsa, he entered the town, where he was shown a plane tree in the market-place where the Turks used to hang the Greeks and he ordered that it be cut down.

Siege of Nafplio
He next commanded with Demetrios Ypsilantis the Greek troops in the siege of the fortress of Nafplio, since September 1821, Acrocorinth (surrendered in January 1822) and later of the fortress of Patras since February 1822.

Greek forces took the port of Nafplion, and the Ottoman garrison in the town's twin citadels was running low on supplies, but the disorganized Greek provisional government at Argos, just to the north, could not complete negotiations for its surrender, before a large Ottoman force began marching southward to crush the revolutionaries. Panicked, government officials abandoned Argos and began evacuations by sea at Nafplion. Only an under-strength battalion under Demetrios Ypsilantis remained to hold Larissa castle, the fortress of Argos.

As liberator

Kolokotronis gathered the klephts together to march to the relief of Ypsilantis. This was quite a feat in itself, considering the near-collapse of the government and the notoriously quarrelsome nature of the klephtic bands. Even the troublesome Souliotes lent a hand. The Ottoman army from the north commanded by Mahmud Dramali Pasha, after taking Corinth, had marched to the plain of Argos. The castle of Larissa was an excellent position, commanding the whole plain. To leave such a stronghold straddling Ottoman supply lines was far too dangerous. Dramali would have to reduce the fortress before moving on. Scaling the cliffs, breaching the castle's stout walls and overcoming its resolute defenders would be no easy task.

Yet, there was one weakness Dramali was unaware of: Larissa, unlike the Acropolis in Athens, had no spring and consequently fresh water had to be supplied from cisterns. Unfortunately for the Greeks, it was July and no rains were falling to fill the cisterns. Ypsilantis bluffed the Ottomans as long as he could, but towards the end of the month had to sneak his men out in the middle of the night. Dramali's men plundered the castle the next day, and he was now free to march them toward the coast to resupply (the Greeks had pursued a scorched earth policy, and the large Ottoman force was eating through its food supplies rather quickly). Ypsilantis's defense had bought Kolokotronis and the klephts valuable time.

To his dismay, Dramali found himself cut off from his supply fleet, which had intended to land at Nafplio but was successfully blockaded by the Greek fleet under Admiral Andreas Miaoulis.

Dramali reluctantly decided upon a retreat toward Corinth through the Dervenaki Pass, through which he had just come unmolested. This was exactly what Kolokotronis had been hoping for. In August 1822, his quicker-moving guerrilla forces trapped the Ottomans in the pass and annihilated them in the Battle of Dervenakia.

A devastated Sultan Mahmud II in Constantinople was forced to turn to Muhammad Ali, ruler of the nominally Ottoman pashaluk of Egypt, for help.

The Greeks resumed the siege against the fortresses at Nafplio, which fell in December. Kolokotronis is said to have ridden his horse up the steep slopes of Palamidi to celebrate his victory there; a statue in the town square commemorates the event. He is attired in the pseudo-classical uniform of the Greek Light Infantry, which he was fond of wearing.

Parliamentary crisis
From December 1823 to February 1825, he took part in the civil wars among the various Greek factions; when his party was finally defeated, he was jailed in Hydra with some of his followers in March 1825, and was released only when an Egyptian army under the command of Ibrahim Pasha invaded the Morea. His eldest son, Panos Kolokotronis, was killed during the second civil war.

Against Ibrahim

Ibrahim was fresh from fighting the Wahhabi rebels in Arabia, and so was used to fighting guerrillas. His troops were armed with the most modern equipment and trained by European experts. The sultan had promised his father the island of Crete as an appanage for young Ibrahim if he could crush the rebels. With his eye on the prize, he burned his way through the Peloponnese, gaining much territory but arousing much hostility in western European public opinion, which in the long run proved disastrous for the Ottomans.

The island of Sphacteria and Navarino had already fallen into Ibrahim's hands, and to make matters worse for Kolokotronis, he still had to be on guard against the machinations of Petros Mavromichalis even as he was bracing himself against the new threat.

Kolokotronis decided to not confront Ibrahim in an open field battle and used guerrilla tactics and scorched earth policy against him; but given his limited resources, was unable to prevent the widespread destruction that Ibrahim left in his wake. Still, in 1825, in recognition of his military acumen and many services to the Greek cause, he was appointed commander-in-chief of Greek forces in the Peloponnese.

Postbellum activities
After the war, Kolokotronis became a supporter of Count Ioannis Kapodistrias and a proponent of alliance with Russia. When the count was assassinated on 8 October 1831, Kolokotronis created his own administration in support of Prince Otto of Bavaria as a King of Greece. However, later he opposed the Bavarian-dominated regency. On 7 June 1834, he was accused, with Dimitrios Plapoutas, for conspiracy against the regency, charged with treason and sentenced to death, though they were ultimately pardoned in 1835.

Theodoros Kolokotronis died in 1843 in Athens one day after his son Konstantinos's (Kollinos) wedding and after a feast at the Royal Palace, in presence of King Otto.

Epilogue
In the twilight of his life, Kolokotronis had learned to write in order to complete his memoirs, which constitute the second best known account of the events of the Greek Revolutionary War after the memoirs of Yannis Makriyannis, and have been translated several times in English and other languages. Kolokotronis's famed helmet, along with the rest of his arms and armor, may today be seen in the National Historical Museum of Greece in Athens. In addition to the Nafplio statue mentioned earlier, there is another to be seen in Athens, in the forecourt of the Old Parliament building on Stadiou Street, near Syntagma Square.

Legacy
Kolokotronis is also the name of military barracks near Tripoli.
A portrait of Kolokotronis was depicted on the Greek ₯5,000 banknote of 1984–2002.
Theodoros Kolokotronis Stadium (Greek: Γήπεδο Θεόδωρος Κολοκοτρώνης), formerly known as Asteras Tripolis Stadium, is a football stadium in Tripoli, Greece. The stadium is the home stadium of Asteras Tripolis.

Gallery

References

Sources

Further reading

External links

Kolokotronis - University of Patras 
Hellenic Parliament: The Speech of Kolokotronis at Pnyx

Videos

1770 births
1843 deaths
19th-century heads of state of Greece
19th-century prime ministers of Greece
Greek generals
People from Messenia
People from Arcadia, Peloponnese
Eastern Orthodox Christians from Greece
Greek military leaders of the Greek War of Independence
Greek prisoners sentenced to death
People convicted of treason against Greece
Recipients of Greek royal pardons
1st Regiment Greek Light Infantry officers
Prisoners sentenced to death by Greece
Burials at the First Cemetery of Athens
Theodoros
Russian Party politicians
Members of the Filiki Eteria